Ohshida Dam  is a gravity dam located in Iwate Prefecture in Japan. The dam is used for irrigation. The catchment area of the dam is 75.7 km2. The dam impounds about 91  ha of land when full and can store 11300 thousand cubic meters of water. The construction of the dam was started on 1984 and completed in 2004.

See also
List of dams in Japan

References

Dams in Iwate Prefecture